Mather is an unincorporated community in the town of Kingston in Juneau County, Wisconsin, United States. Mather has a post office with ZIP code 54641.

History
The Wisconsin Valley Railroad (later the Milwaukee Road) once passed through Mather on its route from Tomah to northern Wisconsin. The Tomah to Babcock portion was abandoned in stages in the 1920s and 1930s, and WIS 173 was built on the right-of-way. A short-lived branch line also ran northwest from Mather to serve logging interests and several tiny communities in eastern Jackson County, and was abandoned by 1900.

Images

References

External links

Unincorporated communities in Juneau County, Wisconsin
Unincorporated communities in Wisconsin